Baía do Inferno (Portuguese for "bay of hell", also: Baía de Santa Clara) is a bay on the southwest coast of the island of Santiago in Cape Verde in the Atlantic Ocean. The bay is completely within the municipality of Santa Catarina. It is a large and relatively sheltered bay, characterised by steep cliffs, more than 400 m high in some places. The nearest settlement is Entre Picos de Reda, 3 km inland. Rincão lies 4 km north along the coast, Porto Mosquito 6 km southeast.

Wildlife
The bay forms a part of the Important Bird Area "Coastal cliffs between Porto Mosquito and Baia do Inferno", which covers 160 ha and about 8 km of coastline. The site has been identified as an IBA by BirdLife International because the cliffs support 25–30 breeding pairs of red-billed tropicbirds. It also supports the largest colony of brown booby in Cape Verde. The adjacent marine area (13 km2, maximum depth 244 m) has also been identified as an IBA, because of its importance for the red-billed tropicbird.

References

Bays of Cape Verde
Santa Catarina, Cape Verde
Geography of Santiago, Cape Verde
Important Bird Areas of Cape Verde
Seabird colonies
Cliffs